The Texas Premier Soccer League (TPSL) is a men's outdoor soccer league that was formed in 2013 consisting of amateur and semi-professional soccer club sides primarily in the Southern region of the state. 2014/15 was the second full season of play for the league.

For the season 2014/15 Austin Real Cuauhtemoc (ARC), Texas Timberz FC, Twin Cities FC and Ranchero King FC were added to the league alongside Houston Hurricanes FC and Galveston. The four other clubs that had been part of the 2013/14 season did not return.

Regular Season Results
09/13/14 Twin Cities 3-1 ARC 
09/13/14 Timberz 1-2 Rancheros FC 
09/20/14 Hurricanes 3-3 Pirates 
09/20/14 Timberz 2-3 Twin Cities 
09/27/14 Pirates 1-3 Timberz 
09/27/14 Rancheros FC 6-4 ARC
10/04/14 Twin Cities 0-3 Hurricanes 
10/04/14 ARC 4-0 Timberz 
10/04/14 Rancheros 0-3 Pirates 
10/11/14 Pirates 2-3 Twin Cities 
10/18/14 Hurricanes 3-0 Rancheros 
10/18/14 Pirates 3-4 ARC 
10/25/14 Rancheros 3-0 Twin Cities 
10/25/14 Hurricanes 3-4 Timberz 
11/01/14 Pirates 2-0 Hurricanes 
11/01/14 Twin Cities 7-1 Timberz  
11/08/14 Timberz 3-1 Pirates 
11/08/14 ARC 3-0 Rancheros FC 
11/15/14 Hurricanes 3-1 Twin Cities 
11/15/14 Timberz 2-0 ARC 
11/15/14 Pirates 3-0 Rancheros
11/22/14 Rancheros 0-3 Timberz 
01/07/15 Rancheros 0-3 Hurricanes 
01/17/15 ARC 1-2 Hurricanes 
01/17/15 Twin Cities 4-2 Pirates 
01/24/15 ARC 4-0 Pirates 
01/31/15 Timberz 1-4 Hurricanes 
01/31/15 ARC 3-1 Twin Cities
02/14/15 Twin Cities 3-0 Rancheros 
02/21/15 Hurricanes 2-5 ARC

Playoff semi-finals

02/28/15 - Houston Hurricanes 2-1 Texas Timberz 
03/07/15 - Austin Real Cuauhtemoc 1-0 Twin Cities

Championship final

03/28/15 - Houston Hurricanes 1-2 Austin Real Cuauhtemoc

Texas State Cup

Eastern

12/03/14 - Pirates 1-0 Hurricanes
12/13/14 - Pirates 3-2 Timberz

Western

01/03/15 - Twin Cities 2-3 ARC

Final

08/02/15 - Pirates 2-4 ARC

2014/15 Season Fixtures (Table Format)

Regular Season Fixtures

Regular Season Standings 
Correct as of Feb 28th, 2105

Playoffs

Championship final

References

External links 
 Texas Premier Soccer League Official Website
 Houston Hurricanes FC Official Website
 Region3Soccer.com 
 Twin Cities FC 
 Texas Timberz FC 
 ARC FC 
 Temple United FC

Soccer in Texas
2014 in sports in Texas
2015 in sports in Texas